The 2014–15 FC Utrecht season was the club's 45th season of existence and its 45th season in the Eredivisie.

Competitions

Pre-season friendlies

Eredivisie

Table

Results

KNVB Cup

Statistics

Appearances and goals 
Appearances for competitive matches only

|-
|}

Top goalscorers

Top assists

Starting XI

Transfers

In

Out

Loan in

Loan out

References

FC Utrecht seasons
Utrecht Fc